The Indonesian Hakka Museum is a museum about Hakka people in Taman Mini Indonesia Indah, East Jakarta, Jakarta, Indonesia.

History
The museum was inaugurated on 30 August 2014 by President Susilo Bambang Yudhoyono.

Architecture
The architecture of the museum building follows the traditional Fujian Tulou houses. The museum is divided into:
 Chinese Museum of Indonesia
 Hakka Museum of Indonesia
 Yongding Hakka Museum of Indonesia

See also

 List of museums and cultural institutions in Indonesia

References

External links
 

2014 establishments in Indonesia
Chinese architecture in Indonesia
Museums in Jakarta
Museums established in 2014
Hakka culture in Indonesia
Hakka museums